KEDO (1270 kHz) is an AM radio station broadcasting a talk/sports format to the Longview, Washington, United States, area. The station is owned by Bicoastal Media Licenses IV, LLC and features programming from Fox News Radio, Premiere Networks, and Westwood One.

In July 2014, the then-KBAM upgraded to a hit country format (with the Morning Show Hosted by 2014 New Mexico Broadcasters Association DJ of The Year Jim Halk (Hawk), who relocated to oversee programming), which was broadcast on both 1270 AM and 93.5 FM, rebranding itself as "NOW COUNTRY 93.5 & 1270AM K-BAM".

On September 3, 2021, the KBAM call sign and the country format moved to 1400 AM Longview, swapping frequencies, formats and call signs with talk/sports-formatted KEDO, which moved to 1270 AM.

References

http://www.newmexicobroadcasters.org/awards/awards.php?y=2014

External links

EDO
Talk radio stations in the United States
Radio stations established in 1955
1955 establishments in Washington (state)